Samdech Preah Sangkhareach Bour Kry (born 11 January 1945) is the seventh and current Supreme Patriarch of the Thammayut order of Cambodia.

Early life
Bour Kry was born in Battambang and was ordained as a Buddhist monk in 1963. His early years in the monkhood were devoted to the study of the Pali Canon. In the following years, he was given the spiritual post of Secretary of the Mekon and appointed to the head of a monastery on the Thai-Cambodian border.

Exile in France
The rise to power of the Khmer Rouge in 1975 began a grim and violent period for the country, and the existence of the Cambodian Sangha was put in critical danger. Bour Kry managed to flee, arriving in France in 1976. In 1977, he founded the Association Bouddhique Khmer (Khmer Buddhist Association) with a small group of expatriate monks and laypersons. The growth of this religious community in the following years led to the establishment of Vatt Khémararam at Créteil, a suburb of Paris, in 1980. Bour Kry's continued support for the Southeast Asian refugee community saw the foundation of Secours Bouddhique International (International Buddhist Assistance), a humanitarian organization independent of the monastery, in 1982.

Royal nominations
Prince Norodom Sihanouk appointed Bour Kry to the rank of Spiritual Eminence in 1987. Following the signing of the Paris Agreement in 1991, King Norodom Sihanouk further appointed Bour Kry to the head of the Cambodian Buddhist  Dhammayuttika order with the title of Supreme Patriarch.

Social and religious activities

After 1991 Bour Kry returned regularly to Cambodia to assist in the reconstruction and redevelopment of Buddhist schools and monasteries. The number of Dhammayuttika monasteries has since grown to over 150. The Preah Sihanouk Dhammadhiraj Buddhist Institute was founded in 1995 with the goal of education and professional training for Cambodia's poorest youth, the revitalization of Buddhist teachings, and the introduction of Cambodian youth to Khmer culture and traditions.

Bour Kry has been involved in addressing the spread of AIDS, participating in international discussions on the topic and encouraging the role of the monastery in disseminating health information. He has also been active in spreading information concerning drug and cigarette dependence in Cambodia.

Titles 
As the Supreme Patriarch of the Dhammayuttika Nikaya, Bour Kry's full official title is Samdech Preah Aphiserei Sukonthea Mohasangreacheathipadei (Abhisirī Sugandhā Mahāsangharājādhipati). This title means 'Of Higher Merit and Pure Virtue, Great Supreme Patriarch Leader'. In letters with King-Father Sihanouk, an abbreviated title is used in the valediction: Samdech Preah Sangreach.

See also
Royal Council of the Throne
Buddhism in Cambodia
Dhammayuttika Nikaya
Modern Cambodia
Norodom Sihanouk
Supreme Patriarch of Cambodia

References

Krasuan Brah Parmarajavamn (Ministry of the Palace) (2003). Brah Raj Rabaini Brah Mahaksatr nin Samtec Brah Sangharaj. Phnom Penh: Krasuan Brah Parmarjavamn.

 Biography of Sangharaja Bour Kry (Vatt Khémararam)

External links
Vatt Khémararam

1945 births
Cambodian religious leaders
Living people
Theravada Buddhist monks
Cambodian Buddhist monks
Cambodian Theravada Buddhists